John Mushet (10 October 1875 — 10 March 1965) was a Scottish first-class cricketer and real estate auctioneer.

Mushet was born at Edinburgh in October 1875, where he was educated at George Heriot's School. A club cricketer for Heriot's Cricket Club, Mushet was the club's first player to be capped for Scotland when he made a single first-class appearance against the touring Australians at Edinburgh in 1912. Batting twice in the match, he was dismissed for 2 runs in the Scotland first innings by Roy Minnett, while in their second innings he was dismissed for a single run by Gerry Hazlitt. Outside of cricket, Mushet worked for the family firm property auctioneers and estate agents John Mushet & Son. He died at Edinburgh in March 1965.

References

External links
 

1875 births
1965 deaths
Cricketers from Edinburgh
People educated at George Heriot's School
Scottish auctioneers
Scottish cricketers